Jean H. MacCurdy is an American television executive, best known for her role as president of Warner Bros. Animation from 1989 to 2001.

Career
MacCurdy began her career as a secretary in the Children's Programming Department at the NBC Television Network in Burbank, California in 1974. In 1976 she was promoted to Manager of Children's Programs by Margaret Loesch, then Director of Children's Programs. MacCurdy was hired by Warner Bros. Animation in 1980, and eventually became a vice president and general manager. In 1983, she left to become an executive for Hanna-Barbera, supervising the production of shows such as The Smurfs and Superfriends.

After a brief stint in 1988–89 at Marvel Productions as VP of Production, MacCurdy was re-hired by Warner Bros. in November 1989 to establish a television animation production operation to produce original content for television. She hired several members of the creative team at Hanna-Barbera, including Tom Ruegger, Paul Dini, and later Alan Burnett, to form the creative team of her first Warner production, the Steven Spielberg-executive produced Tiny Toon Adventures, which ran in syndication.

Under MacCurdy's leadership, Warner Bros. Animation experienced a second renaissance, producing very popular children's programming and winning several Emmys. The company's output was expanded to include other successful programming for the Fox TV during the early 1990s such as Taz-Mania, Batman: The Animated Series, The Plucky Duck Show, Animaniacs, and "Pinky and the Brain."

In 1995, Warner Bros. launched The WB television network, and made the Warner Bros. Animation shows exclusive to it. New shows produced for The WB's Kids' WB block included Superman: The Animated Series, Pinky and the Brain, Freakazoid, The Sylvester & Tweety Mysteries, Road Rovers, Waynehead, Histeria, Batman Beyond, Detention and Pinky, Elmyra & the Brain. During MacCurdy's tenure, Warner Bros. Animation was also the parent company of Hanna-Barbera following the Time Warner/Turner merger, until it was absorbed into Warner Bros. Animation in 2001. MacCurdy resigned as head of Warner Bros. Animation in 2001, and was replaced by Sander Schwartz.

In 1997, MacCurdy was awarded the Women in Film Lucy Award in recognition of her work to enhance and improve the perception of women through the medium of television.

Personal life
MacCurdy lives in the San Francisco Bay Area with her husband and companion of 45 years, William Hogan. She participated in the 2008 San Diego Comic-Con panel on the creation of Tiny Toon Adventures, Freakazoid, and Animaniacs, in San Diego, California.

Filmography

References

External links

Living people
American television producers
American women television producers
Year of birth missing (living people)
21st-century American women